Two Lines is an album by composer David Rosenboom with saxophonist and improviser Anthony Braxton recorded in 1992 and released on the Lovely label.

Reception 
The AllMusic review by Brian Olewnick stated "'It's a fairly dense, uncompromising effort but ultimately quite rewarding for its participants' devotion to Rosenboom's idea as well as for Braxton's inherent creativity in almost any situation. Recommended for fans of Braxton's more outside work".

Track listing 
All compositions by David Rosenboom and Anthony Braxton except where noted.
 "Lineage" – 8:29
 "Enactment" – 9:15
 "Two Lines" (David Rosenboom) – 26:22
 "Transfiguration" – 12:30
 "Transference" – 14:52

Personnel 
Anthony Braxton – sopranino saxophone, soprano saxophone, alto saxophone, clarinet, flute
David Rosenboom – MIDI grand piano, Hierarchical Form Generator, responding sampled piano

References 

Anthony Braxton live albums
David Rosenboom albums
1995 live albums